Suburban Teenage Wasteland Blues is the second album by the punk band, Strung Out with Fat Wreck Chords.  The album was released on April 23, 1996. The title is an amalgamation of Bob Dylan's song "Subterranean Homesick Blues" and a phrase from the song "Baba O'Riley" by The Who. The album received positive reviews from critics and fans alike.

It was remastered and re-released on April 15, 2014 as part of the first volume of Strung Out's 20th anniversary box set.

Track listing
All lyrics by Jason Cruz,
all leads by Rob Ramos except "Firecracker" by Jake Kiley
"Firecracker" – 2:52 (Jim, Jake)
"Better Days" – 2:24 (Jake, Rob)
"Solitaire" – 2:53 (Rob)
"Never Good Enough" – 2:18 (Jake, Rob)
"Gear Box" – 3:31 (Jake, Rob)
"Monster" – 2:21 (Jim, Rob)
"Bring Out Your Dead" – 2:51 (Jim, Rob)
"Rottin' Apple" – 2:28 (Jim, Rob)
"Radio Suicide" – 2:13 (Jim)
"Somnombulance" – 2:23 (Jim, Rob)
"Six Feet" – 1:45 (Jim, Jake)
"Speedball" – 2:02 (Rob)
"Wrong Side of the Tracks" – 2:40 (Rob)

Personnel 
Jason Cruz – Lead vocals, Cover design
Jake Kiley – Guitar
Rob Ramos – Guitar
Jordan Burns – Drums
Jim Cherry – Bass
Max Norman – Mixing
Shawn Burman – Engineer
Ryan Greene – Engineer
Winni – Cover design

References

1996 albums
Strung Out albums
Fat Wreck Chords albums